Michael Jones, better known by his stage name Wax, is an American rapper, singer, songwriter, musician, producer, and comedian. He became a YouTube star after uploading several videos of himself rapping and singing. He currently resides in Los Angeles, California. Wax is widely known for his popular single "Rosana", which was released in 2012.

Early life

Wax is of Irish and Cuban descent and hails from Dunkirk, in Calvert County, Maryland. He grew up watching music videos and live performances on MTV. His biggest influences from his early childhood were Guns N' Roses and DJ Jazzy Jeff & The Fresh Prince. Soon after, in sixth grade, he picked up a guitar and started singing and rapping. Then, in middle school, he started listening to artists such as Eazy-E, N.W.A, and Too Short.

Career

MacGregor
From 2000-2005, Wax was the lead vocalist and guitarist of the six piece band MacGregor. The band toured throughout the United States in the Midwest, the South, and New England, receiving a lot of local buzz in D.C. and Maryland. The group released two albums before entering a "super-extended" hiatus. They split because members had obtained other jobs or engaged in serious relationships. During this time, Wax also released his first solo EP, Biatch!

YouTube
In mid-2007, Wax and his twin brother, Herbal T, started posting videos of themselves rapping on YouTube. In early 2008, Wax made a name for himself after performing his song ("New Crack") over a Stephen Marley track called "Traffic Jam" while driving. The YouTube video has received over 2.2 million views. He also began to collaborate with other well known musicians on YouTube, such as Dumbfoundead and Prince Ea. After he cracked YouTube's Top 100 Musician list, his subscription base tripled and averaged about nearly 1,000 new subscribers each day. His videos have collectively garnered over 80 million views on his YouTube channel. The famous YouTuber Ray William Johnson then asked him to make an outro song titled "Stalkin Ya Mom". The two later collaborated on a song called "Orphan Tears". For Your Favorite Martian's comeback on June 10th, 2022 they collaborated again on "Orphan Tears Part. 2".  On December 15, 2014 he appeared in the Epic Rap Battles of History episode Steven Spielberg Vs. Alfred Hitchcock playing Quentin Tarantino. He later returned to ERB in 2019 in the episode Freddy Krueger vs Wolverine in which he portrayed Freddy Krueger.

Independent venture
Wax and Herbal T released their first album together, Grizzly Season, under AGP Records in 2006.

In 2008, an East Coast producer named EOM (Elements of Music) and Wax collaborated on a song called "The Adventures of Larry and Tina," written by Wax and produced by EOM. Eventually, they recorded an album, Liquid Courage, at the end of 2008. In 2010 Wax released Clockwise, a collaborative effort with Dumbfoundead.

On November 13, 2012, Wax announced a new album entitled "Continue..." that was released January 15, 2013.

On May 27, 2015, Wax announced that his next studio album would be called "Livin' Foul," and include an extended version of a previously unreleased song, "No Smoking in the House." The album was released on October 23, 2015.

Def Jam Recordings
In March 2011, Wax announced that he was signed to Def Jam Recordings by Max Gousse when he released a joint venture mixtape called Scrublife hosted by DJ Skee and Dale Firebird.  EOM, The Fyre Department, Finatik N Zac and Jim Jonsin are featured guest boardworks for the mixtape.  His lead single is a song called Dispensary Girl and the music video debuted on Entertainment Weekly a day before Scrublife released. Wax's debut LP with Def Jam Recordings was hinted to be released in October 2011, but on August 24, 2012, Wax announced on his YouTube channel that he had parted from Def Jam Recordings due to creative differences.

Podcast
In August 2012, Wax began doing a weekly podcast where he discusses a wide variety of issues. The podcast has a few segments on a consistent basis such as "Call Someone and Fuck With Them", "Recommendations from Wax", "Wax's True Hollywood Stories", and "Fan Questions". The Podcast has had many guests such as Wax's Twin Brother Herbal T, Producer EOM, comedian Todd Rexx and more. The average length of the podcast is about an hour, and is generally released every few weeks. As of May 31, 2017, Wax has released 141 podcasts.

Discography

Studio albums 

Liquid Courage (November 25, 2008)
Continue (January 15, 2013; Scrublife)
Livin Foul (October 23, 2015; Scrublife)
The Cookout Chronicles (September 2, 2016; Scrublife)
B.A.A.A. (September 16, 2019; Scrublife)

Collaboration albums
Beat Camp Tactics (with MacGregor), May 13, 2002
Scatterbrain (with MacGregor), December 18, 2003, AGP Records
Grizzly Season (with Herbal T), December 13, 2006, AGP Records
Clockwise (with Dumbfoundead), May 31, 2010, Knocksteady

Live albums
Wax Unplugged (Live from Los Angeles) (February 14, 2013; Scrublife)

EPs
Biatch! (2003)
Back In Business (2017)

Mixtapes
Scrublife (March 15, 2011; Scrublife) – hosted by DJ Skee and Wax's fictional character Dale Firebird, the mixtape was released as a free digital download on DJ Booth.
 Eviction Notice (November 28, 2011; Scrublife) – released as a free digital download on DJ Booth.

Singles

Guest appearances
 2009: Lack Of Afro "International" (ft. Wax & Herbal T) from the album My Groove Your Move
 2009: Lack of Afro "Suspicious Glow" (ft. Wax) from the album My Groove Your Move
 2011: Lack Of Afro "P.a.r.t.y" (ft. Wax and Herbal T) from the album This Time
 2011: Your Favorite Martian "Stalkin' Your Mom" (ft. Wax)
 2011: Your Favorite Martian "Orphan Tears" (ft. Wax)
 2011: Red Ribbon Army "Are You That Somebody" (Aaliyah Cover) (ft. Wax)
 2012: The Palmer Squares "Bag It Up"(ft. Wax)
 2012: Watsky & Kush Mody "Kick Monday" (ft. Wax)
 2012: EOM "Summer Breeze" (ft. Wax, Herbal T, Dumbfoundead, Breezy Lovejoy) from the album For All We Know
 2013: EOM "I'm On It" (ft. Wax) from the album For All We Know
 2013: Watsky "Give a Hater a Hug" (ft. Wax)
 2013: Herbal T "That's That" (ft. Wax) from the album Lo-Fi Blow Dry
 2014: Epic Rap Battles of History "Steven Spielberg vs Alfred Hitchcock" (ft. Wax as Quentin Tarantino)
 2015: DJ Hoppa "Grown" (ft. Devon Lee, Futuristic, Wax & Dizzy Wright) from the album Hoppa and Friends
 2015: Spose "Lies Song" (ft. Wax & Shane Reis) from the album Why Am I So Happy?
 2016: Watsky "Exquisite Corpse" from the album xInfinity
 2017: Lack Of Afro "Back In Business" (ft. Wax & Herbal T) from the EP Back In Business
 2018: Netflix's Cooking on High as a guest judge (Episode: "Southern Comfort")
 2019: Epic Rap Battles of History "Freddy Krueger vs Wolverine (character)"
 2022: Your Favorite Martian "Orphan Tears Part 2 (ft. Cartoon Wax & Stevi the Demon)"
 2022: Your Favorite Martian “Orphan Tears Part 3 (ft. Cartoon Wax & Stevi the Demon)”
 2022: Your Favorite Martian “Uno Reverse (feat. Cartoon Wax)”
 2022: Your Favorite Martian “Eff This Job (feat. Cartoon Wax)”
 2022: Your Favorite Martian "This Is Why I'm Single (feat. Shuba and Cartoon Wax)"
 2022: Your Favorite Martian - "Rich People $hit (feat. Cartoon Wax)"

Music videos
 10/08/2008 "The Adventures of Larry and Tina"
 06/11/2009 "Music and Liquor"
 06/22/2010 "Stay Offa My Facebook"
 09/15/2010 "Crazy Ex"
 02/10/2011 "Don't Need"
 04/15/2011 "Dispensary Girl" 
 07/07/2011 "Two Wheels"
 07/21/2011 "Coins"
 12/14/2011 "Guess Who"
 12/24/2011 "Need"
 07/13/2012 "Rosana" 
 11/15/2012 "Toothbrush"
 12/21/2012 "Lewis and Clark"
 03/10/2013 "We Can't All Be Heroes"
 06/27/2013 "I Shoulda Tried Harder"
 07/22/2013 "She Used to be Mine"
 10/15/2013 "Feels Good"
 10/31/2013 "Good Night"
 01/26/2015 "Dreamin" 
 06/04/2015 "No Smoking In The House"
 08/27/2015 "This One's On Me"
 10/28/2015 "The Meanest"
 10/07/2016 "First Love"

References

External links 
 
 Wax's Official Twitter Page
 Wax's Official Facebook Page
 Wax's Official Youtube Page

Living people
Def Jam Recordings artists
Rappers from Washington, D.C.
1980 births
Rappers from Maryland
American male rappers
People from Calvert County, Maryland
21st-century American rappers
21st-century American male musicians
American people of Irish descent
American musicians of Cuban descent